Russell Hansbrough (born November 19, 1993) is a former American football running back. He played college football at Missouri, and was signed as an undrafted free agent by the Tampa Bay Buccaneers in 2016. He has played for the New York Giants, Los Angeles Chargers, and Washington Redskins.

Professional career

Tampa Bay Buccaneers
Hansbrough signed with the Tampa Bay Buccaneers as an undrafted free agent following the 2016 NFL Draft. He was released on September 5, 2016 and signed to the practice squad the next day. He was released on September 14, 2016 and re-signed on October 5. He was promoted to the active roster on October 10, 2016. He was released on October 17, 2016 and was re-signed to the practice squad. He was promoted back to the active roster on November 7, 2016 but was released again on November 12. He was re-signed to the practice squad on November 15, 2016. He was released by the Buccaneers on November 22, 2016.

New York Giants
On December 14, 2016, Hansbrough was signed to the New York Giants' practice squad.

Tampa Bay Buccaneers (second stint)
On December 27, 2016, Hansbrough was signed by the Buccaneers off the Giants' practice squad. He was waived on September 2, 2017 and was signed to the Buccaneers' practice squad the next day. He was released on October 3, 2017.

Los Angeles Chargers
On December 12, 2017, Hansbrough was signed to the Los Angeles Chargers' practice squad. He was promoted to the active roster on December 29, 2017. On September 1, 2018, Hansbrough was waived.

Washington Redskins
On December 18, 2018, Hansbrough was signed to the Washington Redskins practice squad. He signed a reserve/future contract on January 3, 2019, but was waived on May 13, 2019.

Calgary Stampeders
In May 2020, Hansbrough signed with the Calgary Stampeders of the Canadian Football League. He was released on June 16, 2021.

References

External links 
Tampa Bay Buccaneers bio

1993 births
Living people
American football running backs
Calgary Stampeders players
Los Angeles Chargers players
Missouri Tigers football players
New York Giants players
Players of American football from Texas
Sportspeople from Arlington, Texas
Tampa Bay Buccaneers players
Washington Redskins players